Nihil admirari (or "Nil admirari") is a Latin phrase. It means "to be surprised by nothing", or in the imperative, "Let nothing astonish you".

Origin
Marcus Tullius Cicero argues that real sapience consists of preparing oneself for all possible incidents and not being surprised by anything, using as an example Anaxagoras, who, when informed about the death of his son, said, "Sciebam me genuisse mortalem" (I knew that I begot a mortal). Horace and Seneca refer to similar occurrences and admired such moral fortitude."Marvel at nothing" – that is perhaps the one and only thing that can make a man happy and keep him so.Nietzsche wrote that in this proposition the ancient philosopher "sees the whole of philosophy", opposing it to Schopenhauer's admirari id est philosophari (to marvel is to philosophize).

References

External link

Latin words and phrases